Hackapike Bay is an anchorage  northwest of Ryswyck Point, entered west of False Island along the northeast coast of Anvers Island, in the Palmer Archipelago, Antarctica. It was charted and named by the British Graham Land Expedition, 1934–37, under John Rymill.

See also
Gerlache Strait Geology
Anvers Island Geology

References

Bays of the Palmer Archipelago